Zhuangyuan Subdistrict may refer to:

Zhuangyuan Subdistrict, Qixia, Shandong, China
Zhuangyuan Subdistrict, Wenzhou, Zhejiang, China

See also
Zhuangyuan, top finisher of the Chinese imperial examination